Wirral Rugby Football Club is a rugby union club based in Thornton Common Road, Clatterbridge, Wirral, England. It has many mini, junior teams from under-7s upwards, and runs colts and four senior men's teams, a ladies team (Wirral Warriors) and girls age group teams. The club was formed in 1937 and was based at the school in Hooton, and since 1967, at its present ground. The first team play in Regional 1 North West, a fifth level league in the English league system. The team used to be called the "Old Wirralians" due to its historical association with Wirral Grammar School. A former notable player is Matt Cairns who played for England against South Africa in the first test of 2007.

Honours
 South Lancs/Cheshire 2 champions: 2001–02
 Cheshire Plate winners: 2003
 Cheshire Vase winners (2): 2009, 2018
 South Lancs/Cheshire 1 champions: 2009–10
 North 1 West champions: 2013–14

References

External links
 Wirral RUFC

English rugby union teams
1937 establishments in England
Rugby clubs established in 1937
Sport in the Metropolitan Borough of Wirral